Hatebreed is an American metalcore band from Bridgeport, Connecticut, formed in 1994. The band released its debut album Satisfaction is the Death of Desire in 1997, which gave the band a cult following. The band signed to Universal Records and released Perseverance in 2002, which hit the Billboard 200. Combining elements of hardcore and heavy metal, the band is often described as a metalcore, hardcore punk, and beatdown hardcore band. They have played a major role in the Connecticut hardcore scene.

History 
Hatebreed was formed in 1994 in Bridgeport, Connecticut. They began by recording a three song demo and selling it to locals. Those three songs would eventually be released on a split 7" with New York's Neglect in 1995. They followed that with the highly acclaimed EP Under the Knife scheduled to come out on Big Wheel Recreation in 1995 but then was self-released 1996, and went out on tour around the east coast/midwest supporting UKHC band Voorhees. The following year they released Satisfaction Is the Death of Desire on Victory Records, then the home of some of the biggest bands in American hardcore. Satisfaction sold more copies than any other debut in the history of the record company.

Tours with heavy metal bands such as Slayer, Deftones, Entombed and Napalm Death influenced their music and brought them to the attention of many non-hardcore fans. These influences were apparent on the band's next two releases, 2002's Perseverance, and especially 2003's The Rise of Brutality.

After the release of The Rise of Brutality, the band took part in the 2004 Unholy Alliance tour in Europe with Slayer, Slipknot and Mastodon. In June 2006, Hatebreed went on an extensive European tour which included a performance at the Download Festival in Castle Donington, UK. Immediately following this European tour, they played the main stage at Ozzfest 2006 alongside DragonForce, Lacuna Coil, Avenged Sevenfold, Disturbed, and co-headliners System of a Down.

The band's fourth album, Supremacy, was released in August 2006, their first through Roadrunner Records, featuring new guitarist Frank Novinec (who had previously spent time playing with Ringworm, Terror, and Integrity). Jasta described it as an "all-out onslaught of completely adrenaline-charged, in-your-face brutality".

On September 13, 2006, former guitarist Lou Richards committed suicide at the age of 35; he had played on 1997's Satisfaction Is the Death of Desire and left the band in 2002.

Hatebreed headlined the second stage on the 2007 Ozzfest tour.  Hatebreed appeared at Wacken Open Air festival in 2008 alongside Iron Maiden, Children of Bodom, and Avantasia. In April 2008, Hatebreed signed a worldwide deal with Koch Records for the release of their live DVD, a live album, and a cover album entitled For the Lions, which was released on May 5. On September 2, they released their concert DVD, entitled Live Dominance. Artists covered included Metallica, D.R.I., Crowbar, and the Cro-Mags.

On February 9, 2009, guitarist Sean Martin quit the band.
Sean quit the band to pursue other interests in music that are more studio-related. However, Sean remains close to and in contact with Hatebreed members.

Hatebreed's fifth studio album, entitled Hatebreed, was released September 29, 2009. In May 2009, the band also released For the Lions, a record consisting of covers of songs by artists that have influenced the band's development.

In 2010, Hatebreed participated in the third annual Mayhem Festival, alongside 3 Inches of Blood, Shadows Fall, and other bands.
On February 17, 2011, it was announced that Hatebreed would partake in the fourth annual Mayhem Festival to yet again headline the Jägermeister stage for three dates only. Hatebreed also got to play on the 2013 Vans Warped Tour in Australia alongside bands like Parkway Drive, The Offspring, Simple Plan, The Used, We Came as Romans, Man Overboard, H2O and many more. As well as the United Kingdom Warped Tour alongside Coheed and Cambria, Rise Against, Enter Shikari, Flogging Molly, Like Moths to Flames, The Wonder Years, Sublime With Rome & much more.

Their sixth studio album, The Divinity of Purpose, was released on January 25, 2013 in Europe and on January 29 in North America. The cover art was done by Eliran Kantor (Testament, Sodom). Hatebreed released its seventh album, The Concrete Confessional, on May 13, 2016. Hatebreed was also announced to take part on the 2017 Vans Warped Tour, as they appeared on the Monster Energy Stage alongside other bands like GWAR, CKY, Carnifex, Municipal Waste, After the Burial, Silent Planet, Anti Flag and many more groups rounded out the lineup. After touring the early part of 2019 with Obituary, Cro-Mags, Terror, and Fit for an Autopsy, Jamey Jasta said the band will spend the second half of 2019 writing and recording a new album. The band's eight studio album Weight of the False Self was released on November 27, 2020. In the summer of 2021, Hatebreed, along with Trivium, will serve as an opening act for Megadeth and Lamb of God on the "Metal Tour of the Year". Hatebreed replaces In Flames, who were forced to withdraw from the tour due to international visa issues caused by the COVID-19 pandemic.

Grammy nomination
In December 2004, it was announced that Hatebreed was nominated for a Grammy Award for Best Metal Performance at the 47th Grammy Awards in Los Angeles for their song "Live for This", which appeared on their album The Rise of Brutality. The award was ultimately given to Motörhead for their cover of the Metallica song "Whiplash" which appeared on the album Metallic Attack: The Ultimate Tribute.

Controversies
In the mid-1990s, vocalist of emoviolence band In/Humanity Chris Bickel produced a zine calling out Victory Records for their business practices. Bickel attended a Hatebreed show and was quickly surrounded by the band, which threatened him with violence and called him homophobic slurs. After the show, frontman and vocalist Jamey Jasta declared himself a homophobe and again threatened Bickel with violence in a voicemail. In/Humanity played this voicemail to open their shows, and when Hatebreed played In/Humanity's hometown of Columbia, South Carolina, between-song banter included their hatred of Bickel and his band.

In a CNN article published on August 8, 2012, Hatebreed was accused of being a white supremacist band in the aftermath of the Wisconsin Sikh temple shooting, perpetrated by a white supremacist musician. The band disavowed any racist sentiments and expressed deep disappointment in the U.S. cable news channel on Twitter. CNN later became aware of the error, removed Hatebreed's name from the piece and apologized for the mistake.

Hatebreed is a longtime sponsor of UFC fighter Chris Camozzi. At UFC 158 in Montreal on March 16, 2013, Camozzi claimed he was required by the UFC "for some reason" to cover Hatebreed's logos, on his T-shirt and ring introduction banner, with black tape.

In 2016, former drummer Nick "Nickel P" Papantoniou (a member of the band from 1996 to 1997) was sentenced to 45 years in prison after being convicted of felony murder. That conviction was overturned in January 2023 when it was discovered by Attorney James Ruane and proven at trial that Papantoniou's trial attorney had brokered a deal with the prosecution on behalf of another client to testify against Papantoniou and that deal was never disclosed to the court or Papantoniou. The court found Papantoniou's original attorney provided ineffective assistance of counsel and reversed the finding and ordered a new trial to occur.

Musical style and influences

Combining hardcore with heavy metal, Hatebreed's musical style has been described as metalcore hardcore punk, and beatdown hardcore. They are considered important to the development of metalcore, blending influences from hardcore and punk rock, as well as heavy metal subgenres such as thrash metal and groove metal, alongside other bands in the 1990s metalcore scene (such as Earth Crisis, All Out War, Integrity and Converge). They are also influenced by crossover thrash. Jasta has also called Hatebreed 'Celtic Frost hardcore'.

Hatebreed's influences include metal and hardcore bands such as Agnostic Front, Carcass, Celtic Frost, Earth Crisis, Entombed, Integrity, Killing Time, Obituary, Sepultura, Sheer Terror, and Slayer.

Band members 

Current members
 Jamey Jasta – lead vocals (1994–present)
 Chris Beattie – bass (1994–present)
 Matt Byrne – drums  (2001–present)
 Frank Novinec – rhythm guitar, backing vocals (2006–present)
 Wayne Lozinak – lead guitar, backing vocals (1994–1996, 2009–present)

Former members
 Larry Dwyer Jr. – rhythm guitar, backing vocals (1994–1996)
 Dave Russo – drums (1994–1996)
 Nick "Nickel P" Papantoniou – drums (1996–1997)
 Matt McIntosh – lead guitar, backing vocals (1996–1999)
 Jamie "Pushbutton" Muckinhaupt – drums (1997–1999)
 Rigg Ross – drums (1999–2001)
 Lou Richards – rhythm guitar, backing vocals (1996–2002; died 2006)
 Sean Martin – lead guitar, backing vocals (1999–2009); rhythm guitar (2002–2006)

Timeline

Discography

Studio albums
 Satisfaction Is the Death of Desire (1997)
 Perseverance (2002)
 The Rise of Brutality (2003)
 Supremacy (2006)
 Hatebreed (2009)
 The Divinity of Purpose (2013)
 The Concrete Confessional (2016)
 Weight of the False Self (2020)

Awards and nominations

Grammy Awards

|-
| 2004 || Live for This || Best Metal Performance || 

Revolver Golden Gods Awards

|-
| 2013 || Hatebreed || Best Live Band || 

Loudwire Music Awards

|-
| 2012 || Hatebreed || Death Match Hall of Fame ||

References

Further reading

External links

Metalcore musical groups from Connecticut
Heavy metal musical groups from Connecticut
Musical groups from Bridgeport, Connecticut
1994 establishments in Connecticut
Musical groups established in 1994
Musical quintets
MNRK Music Group artists
Nuclear Blast artists
Razor & Tie artists
Roadrunner Records artists
Victory Records artists
Articles which contain graphical timelines
Race-related controversies in the United States
2012 controversies in the United States
Music controversies
Universal Records artists